Richlands is a town in Tazewell County, Virginia, United States. The population was 5,261 at the 2020 census. It is part of the Bluefield, WV-VA micropolitan area which has a population of 107,578.

History
Located along the banks of the Clinch River, Richlands began as a farming community and was named for its fertile "rich lands."

The Clinch Valley Coal & Iron Company began to develop Richlands in 1890, and company officials hoped Richlands' readily available coal, iron, and timber might make it the "Pittsburgh of the South." The company abandoned its plans following the stock market crash of 1893.

In February 1893, Richlands was the site of a mass lynching of five black railroad workers after it was alleged some of the men had robbed and beaten a white man.  Four of the railroad workers were arrested and held in the Richlands jail, but the jailor was overpowered by a mob of white townspeople, including James Hurt, a magistrate and member of the Richlands town council, and James Crabtree, a prominent businessman, who removed the four men and hanged them from the same tree.  A fifth black railroad worker was later found and lynched.

The Richlands Historic District encompasses much of downtown Richlands, and the Tazewell Avenue Historic District, and Williams House, are both listed on the National Register of Historic Places.

Geography
Richlands is situated along the Clinch River just east of the Tazewell-Russell county line.  Cedar Bluff borders Richlands to the east, and the community of Raven lies just to the west.  U.S. Route 460 and Virginia State Route 67 both traverse Richlands.

According to the United States Census Bureau, the town has a total area of 2.7 square miles (6.9 km²), all land.

Climate
The Trewartha climate classification for Richlands is temperate oceanic due to five months of winter chill (monthly means below 10 °C (50 °F)), abbreviated "Do" on climate maps.

Demographics

At the 2000 census there were 4,144 people, 1,882 households, and 1,223 families living in the town. The population density was 1,565.7 people per square mile (603.8/km²). There were 2,137 housing units at an average density of 807.4 per square mile (311.4/km²).  The racial makeup of the town was 98.75% White, 0.05% African American, 0.12% Native American, 0.51% Asian, 0.19% from other races, and 0.39% from two or more races. Hispanic or Latino of any race were 0.34%.

Of the 1,882 households 25.2% had children under the age of 18 living with them, 48.7% were married couples living together, 12.8% had a female householder with no husband present, and 35.0% were non-families. 32.1% of households were one person and 15.6% were one person aged 65 or older. The average household size was 2.20 and the average family size was 2.76.

The age distribution was 20.1% under the age of 18, 8.3% from 18 to 24, 27.7% from 25 to 44, 25.4% from 45 to 64, and 18.5% 65 or older. The median age was 41 years. For every 100 females there were 81.9 males. For every 100 females age 18 and over, there were 79.0 males.

The median household income was $23,712 and the median family income  was $30,257. Males had a median income of $30,682 versus $18,670 for females. The per capita income for the town was $15,548. About 13.6% of families and 17.8% of the population were below the poverty line, including 24.1% of those under age 18 and 16.9% of those age 65 or over.

Education
Richlands is served by the Tazewell County Public School System.  Schools in Richlands include:
 Richlands Elementary School
 Richlands Middle School
 Richlands High School

It is served by Southwest Virginia Community College, which is located in nearby Wardell, Virginia. King University, based in Bristol, Tennessee, has a satellite campus at SWVCC.

In popular culture 
Blues musician Mississippi John Hurt performed Richland Women Blues.  The lyrics were risqué for the early 1930s, filled with sexual double entendres.

Virginian singer and pianist Bruce Hornsby wrote a song set in Richlands, entitled "The Road Not Taken". It appears on his 1988 album Scenes from the Southside.

Notable people 
 Mike Compton, former guard for the Detroit Lions, New England Patriots, and Jacksonville Jaguars.
 Cathryn Hankla, poet and artist.
 Heath Miller, former tight end and  2 time Super Bowl Champion for the Pittsburgh Steelers.
 Jim Moody, member of U.S. House of Representatives from Wisconsin.

References

External links 
 
 Town website
 Richlands Area Chamber of Commerce

Towns in Tazewell County, Virginia